Live: Let's Work Together is the second live album by George Thorogood & the Destroyers.

It was recorded on December 2–3, 1994 at Mississippi Nights in St. Louis, Missouri and December 5, 1994 at Center Stage in Atlanta, and released in 1995 on the EMI Records label.

The album featured guest appearances by musicians Elvin Bishop and Johnnie Johnson.

Track listing
 "No Particular Place to Go" (Chuck Berry) – 5:14 
 "Ride On Josephine" (Ellas McDaniel) – 6:56 
 "Bad Boy" (Larry Williams) – 4:50 
 "Cocaine Blues" (T. J. Amall) – 3:33 
 "If You Don't Start Drinkin' (I'm Gonna Leave)" (George Thorogood) – 4:26 
 "I'm Ready" (Willie Dixon) – 5:12 
 "I'll Change My Style" (David Parker, Manuel Villa) – 4:39 
 "Get a Haircut" (David Avery, Bill Birch) – 5:41 
 "Gear Jammer" (George Thorogood) – 6:11 
 "Move It on Over" (Hank Williams) – 6:08 
 "You Talk Too Much" (George Thorogood) – 6:17 
 "Let's Work Together" (with Elvin Bishop and Johnnie Johnson) (Wilbert Harrison) – 6:46 
 "St. Louis Blues" (with Johnnie Johnson) (W. C. Handy) – 7:03 
 "Johnny B. Goode" (with Johnnie Johnson) (Chuck Berry) – 5:55

Personnel
George Thorogood - guitars, vocals
Jeff Simon - drums
Bill Blough - bass
Hank Carter - saxophone, keyboards, backing vocals

References

George Thorogood and the Destroyers live albums
1995 albums
EMI Records live albums
Albums produced by Terry Manning